disambiguation: may also refer to Godzilla: Monster Planet

Monster Planet (2005) is a horror novel by American writer David Wellington. It is the third and final novel in the author's Monster series of zombie apocalypse horror.

Plot introduction
Monster Planet takes place twelve years after the events in Monster Island. Sarah, Dekalb's now 20-year-old daughter, fights alongside Ayaan and her squad of female Somali warriors to defend their last remaining settlements from the encroaching undead forces. Meanwhile, a powerful lich from Russia who calls himself "The Tsarevich" leads his army west on an unknown expedition.

External links 
 Text of Monster Planet online
 The author's site

2004 American novels
American horror novels
American post-apocalyptic novels
American zombie novels

Novels first published in serial form
Zombie novels